Ana Varela is a Spanish sprint canoer who competed in the mid-2000s. She won a bronze medal in the K-4 200 m event at the 2005 ICF Canoe Sprint World Championships in Zagreb.

References
 
 

Living people
Spanish female canoeists
Year of birth missing (living people)
ICF Canoe Sprint World Championships medalists in kayak
Canoeists at the 2015 European Games
European Games competitors for Spain
21st-century Spanish women